The following is a list of presidents of CAF, the African association football governing body. The current president is Patrice Motsepe from South Africa.

Presidents of CAF

 
† Indicates that the title of Honorary President was conferred upon leaving office.

‡ Acted for a transitional period from 18 August 1987 following Tessema's death in Addis Ababa due to illness, until 10 March 1988 when the general assembly was held in Casablanca and Issa Hayatou was elected president of CAF.

See also

List of presidents of FIFA
List of presidents of UEFA
List of presidents of AFC
List of presidents of CONCACAF
List of presidents of CONMEBOL
List of presidents of OFC

References

 
Presidents of CAF
CAF